Vawter may refer to:

Locations
Vawter, Minnesota, an unincorporated community in Morrison County, Minnesota, US
Vawter Hall and Old President's House, two historic buildings at Virginia State University in Ettrick, Virginia, US
Vawter Park Village, an unincorporated area on Lake Wawasee, Indiana, US
J.G. and Elizabeth S. Vawter House, a historic residence in Winterset, Iowa, US
Page-Vawter House, a historic house in Ansted, Fayette County, West Virginia, US

People
Vawter (surname), including a list of people with the name